The 1994 Clásica de San Sebastián was the 14th edition of the Clásica de San Sebastián cycle race and was held on 6 August 1994. The race started and finished in San Sebastián. The race was won by Armand de Las Cuevas of the Castorama team.

General classification

References

Clásica de San Sebastián
San
Clasica De San Sebastian
August 1994 sports events in Europe